The Dunfermline and West Fife by-election was held on 9 February 2006, following the death of the sitting Labour MP Rachel Squire, on 6 January. The by-election was the first seat to change hands in the 2005 Parliament, when Willie Rennie won the seat for the Liberal Democrats, gaining it from Labour by 1,800 votes. The BBC reported a swing from Labour to the Liberal Democrats of 16.24%.

It was the first time Labour had lost a seat at a Westminster by-election in Scotland since the Scottish National Party won the Glasgow Govan by-election in 1988, and the first time Labour had ever lost to the Liberal Democrats, or their predecessors the Liberal Party, in a Scottish Westminster by-election. The by-election took place in the middle of a leadership election for the Liberal Democrats, and the party was perceived in the media to be declining in the polls as a result of negative publicity surrounding the resignation of former leader Charles Kennedy, as well as revelations about the private lives of Mark Oaten and Simon Hughes.

The constituency of Dunfermline and West Fife was first created for the United Kingdom Parliament at the 2005 general election and saw a comfortable Labour win at that election. It was the second Westminster by-election in a Scottish constituency since the 2005 general election. In the 2005 Livingston by-election, Labour retained the seat, with the Scottish National Party second, but 2,680 votes behind. The Livingston constituency lies just across the Firth of Forth from the Dunfermline and West Fife constituency.

Labour gained the seat back at the 2010 general election, with the Liberal Democrats in second place.

Campaign
The Courier reported on 23 January that leaked minutes of a meeting on 11 January at Westminster revealed that "senior Scottish Liberal Democrats do not believe their party has any chance of winning the Dunfermline and West Fife by-election", and that "their aim is to beat the SNP rather than topple Labour". This suggestion was backed up on 27 January by a poll in  The Daily Telegraph that put the Lib Dems at 13% UK-wide (down 9% on Election 2005), their worst position since the 2001 general election.

The Sunday Herald reported on 29 January that they had "evidence of a high-level "fix" to select (the Labour) candidate", because "party bosses sent out a leaflet on behalf of Catherine Stihler’s campaign hours before she was selected to fight the seat." This story followed earlier reports of a similar row over the selection of the Conservative and Unionist candidate: Fife Tory leader Stuart Randall's claim that he was left off the shortlist for being "far too old and middle-aged to fit the bill". Randall, who stood as Conservative candidate against Gordon Brown in Dunfermline East at the 2001 and 2005 general elections and fought Dunfermline East at the 2003 Scottish Parliament election, was aged only 43. Local Conservative activists were reported to be furious that such a high-profile local figure was left off the shortlist of candidates for the by-election.

The by-election electorate for the constituency was 72,225, a slight increase (of 2.04%) on the general election in May 2005.

Implications (for UK and Scottish elections)

The constituency neighbours Kirkcaldy and Cowdenbeath, the seat of Gordon Brown, former Leader of the Labour Party and Prime Minister. Brown actually lived in the Dunfermline and West Fife constituency; he was Chancellor of the Exchequer at the time. The constituency is also near to North East Fife, then the constituency of Sir Menzies Campbell, acting leader of the Liberal Democrats at the time. Prior to the election, it was speculated that a poor showing for either party in the vicinity of Brown and/or Campbell's political bases could impact upon their chances of winning their respective parties' leaderships.

The result of this Westminster by-election were seen as a litmus test of the parties' standing prior to the 2007 Scottish Parliament election; the Liberal Democrats proceeded to win the Dunfermline West seat, which comprises the bulk of Dunfermline and West Fife, from Labour in the 2007 Holyrood election. The results of all by-elections in Scotland have been particularly highly valued by psephologists and political commentators since the demise of the last regular, monthly Scottish voting-intention poll (by The Herald and Taylor Nelson Sofres System 3) at the end of 2003. The result was also notable as it came at a time when Labour's national opinion poll ratings were very high.

Immediately after the election, the Liberal Democrats claimed that the results showed they were the challengers to the Labour Party, and that the Conservatives had failed their first electoral test under their new leader, David Cameron.

Result

Previous election

See also 
Elections in Scotland
Politics of Scotland

References

External links
Campaign literature from the by-election
"Labour MP dies after long illness" from BBC News
Scottish Elections Between 1997 and present

Dunfermline and West Fife by-election
Dunfermline and West Fife by-election
2000s elections in Scotland
By-elections to the Parliament of the United Kingdom in Scottish constituencies
Politics of Fife
Politics of Dunfermline
21st century in Fife
Dunfermline and West Fife by-election